Habu is the common name of a number of species of venomous snakes. 

Habu may also refer to:

Chironex yamaguchii, a venomous box jellyfish, known in Japan as the habu kurage 
Habu, Botswana, a village
HABU equivalent, a measure of computer performance
Lockheed A-12, reconnaissance aircraft, as an early project nickname
Lockheed SR-71 Blackbird, reconnaissance aircraft, as an early project nickname
Yoshiharu Habu (born 1970), Japanese shogi player
Mizuho Habu (born 1997), Japanese idol